Oxidative stress reflects an imbalance between the systemic manifestation of reactive oxygen species and a biological system's ability to readily detoxify the reactive intermediates or to repair the resulting damage. Disturbances in the normal redox state of cells can cause toxic effects through the production of peroxides and free radicals that damage all components of the cell, including proteins, lipids, and DNA. Oxidative stress from oxidative metabolism causes base damage, as well as strand breaks in DNA. Base damage is mostly indirect and caused by the reactive oxygen species generated, e.g., O2− (superoxide radical), OH (hydroxyl radical) and H2O2 (hydrogen peroxide). Further, some reactive oxidative species act as cellular messengers in redox signaling. Thus, oxidative stress can cause disruptions in normal mechanisms of cellular signaling.

In humans, oxidative stress is thought to be involved in the development of attention deficit hyperactivity disorder, cancer, Parkinson's disease, Lafora disease, Alzheimer's disease, atherosclerosis, heart failure, myocardial infarction, fragile X syndrome, sickle-cell disease, lichen planus, vitiligo, autism, infection, chronic fatigue syndrome, and depression; however, reactive oxygen species can be beneficial, as they are used by the immune system as a way to attack and kill pathogens. Short-term oxidative stress may also be important in prevention of aging by induction of a process named mitohormesis, and is required to initiate stress response processes in plants.

Chemical and biological effects

Chemically, oxidative stress is associated with increased production of oxidizing species or a significant decrease in the effectiveness of antioxidant defenses, such as glutathione. The effects of oxidative stress depend upon the size of these changes, with a cell being able to overcome small perturbations and regain its original state. However, more severe oxidative stress can cause cell death, and even moderate oxidation can trigger apoptosis, while more intense stresses may cause necrosis.

Production of reactive oxygen species is a particularly destructive aspect of oxidative stress. Such species include free radicals and peroxides. Some of the less reactive of these species (such as superoxide) can be converted by oxidoreduction reactions with transition metals or other redox cycling compounds (including quinones) into more aggressive radical species that can cause extensive cellular damage. Most long-term effects are caused by damage to DNA. DNA damage induced by ionizing radiation is similar to oxidative stress, and these lesions have been implicated in aging and cancer. Biological effects of single-base damage by radiation or oxidation, such as 8-oxoguanine and thymine glycol, have been extensively studied. Recently the focus has shifted to some of the more complex lesions. Tandem DNA lesions are formed at substantial frequency by ionizing radiation and metal-catalyzed H2O2 reactions. Under anoxic conditions, the predominant double-base lesion is a species in which C8 of guanine is linked to the 5-methyl group of an adjacent 3'-thymine (G[8,5- Me]T). Most of these oxygen-derived species are produced by normal aerobic metabolism. Normal cellular defense mechanisms destroy most of these.  Repair of oxidative damages to DNA is frequent and ongoing, largely keeping up with newly induced damages. In rat urine, about 74,000 oxidative DNA adducts per cell are excreted daily. There is also a steady state level of oxidative damages in the DNA of a cell. There are about 24,000 oxidative DNA adducts per cell in young rats and 66,000 adducts per cell in old rats. Likewise, any damage to cells is constantly repaired. However, under the severe levels of oxidative stress that cause necrosis, the damage causes ATP depletion, preventing controlled apoptotic death and causing the cell to simply fall apart.

Polyunsaturated fatty acids, particularly arachidonic acid and linoleic acid, are primary targets for free radical and singlet oxygen oxidations. For example, in tissues and cells, the free radical oxidation of linoleic acid produces racemic mixtures of 13-hydroxy-9Z,11E-octadecadienoic acid, 13-hydroxy-9E,11E-octadecadienoic acid, 9-hydroxy-10E,12-E-octadecadienoic acid (9-EE-HODE), and 11-hydroxy-9Z,12-Z-octadecadienoic acid as well as 4-Hydroxynonenal while singlet oxygen attacks linoleic acid to produce (presumed but not yet proven to be racemic mixtures of) 13-hydroxy-9Z,11E-octadecadienoic acid, 9-hydroxy-10E,12-Z-octadecadienoic acid, 10-hydroxy-8E,12Z-octadecadienoic acid, and 12-hydroxy-9Z-13-E-octadecadienoic (see 13-Hydroxyoctadecadienoic acid and 9-Hydroxyoctadecadienoic acid).  Similar attacks on arachidonic acid produce a far larger set of products including various isoprostanes, hydroperoxy- and hydroxy- eicosatetraenoates, and 4-hydroxyalkenals.  While many of these products are used as markers of oxidative stress, the products derived from linoleic acid appear far more predominant than arachidonic acid products and therefore easier to identify and quantify in, for example, atheromatous plaques.  Certain linoleic acid products have also been proposed to be markers for specific types of oxidative stress. For example, the presence of racemic 9-HODE and 9-EE-HODE mixtures reflects free radical oxidation of linoleic acid whereas the presence of racemic 10-hydroxy-8E,12Z-octadecadienoic acid and 12-hydroxy-9Z-13-E-octadecadienoic acid reflects singlet oxygen attack on linoleic acid.  In addition to serving as markers, the linoleic and arachidonic acid products can contribute to tissue and/or DNA damage but also act as signals to stimulate pathways which function to combat oxidative stress.

Table adapted from.

Production and consumption of oxidants
One source of reactive oxygen under normal conditions in humans is the leakage of activated oxygen from mitochondria during oxidative phosphorylation. E. coli mutants that lack an active electron transport chain produce as much hydrogen peroxide as wild-type cells, indicating that other enzymes contribute the bulk of oxidants in these organisms. One possibility is that multiple redox-active flavoproteins all contribute a small portion to the overall production of oxidants under normal conditions.

Other enzymes capable of producing superoxide are xanthine oxidase, NADPH oxidases and cytochromes P450. Hydrogen peroxide is produced by a wide variety of enzymes including several oxidases. Reactive oxygen species play important roles in cell signalling, a process termed redox signaling. Thus, to maintain proper cellular homeostasis, a balance must be struck between reactive oxygen production and consumption.

The best studied cellular antioxidants are the enzymes superoxide dismutase (SOD), catalase, and glutathione peroxidase. Less well studied (but probably just as important) enzymatic antioxidants are the peroxiredoxins and the recently discovered sulfiredoxin. Other enzymes that have antioxidant properties (though this is not their primary role) include paraoxonase, glutathione-S transferases, and aldehyde dehydrogenases.

The amino acid methionine is prone to oxidation, but oxidized methionine can be reversible. Oxidation of methionine is shown to inhibit the phosphorylation of adjacent Ser/Thr/Tyr sites in proteins.  This gives a plausible mechanism for cells to couple oxidative stress signals with cellular mainstream signaling such as phosphorylation.

Diseases

Oxidative stress is suspected to be important in neurodegenerative diseases including Lou Gehrig's disease (aka MND or ALS), Parkinson's disease, Alzheimer's disease, Huntington's disease, depression, and multiple sclerosis. It is also indicated in Neurodevelopmental conditions such as Autism Spectrum Disorder. Indirect evidence via monitoring biomarkers such as reactive oxygen species, and reactive nitrogen species production indicates oxidative damage may be involved in the pathogenesis of these diseases, while cumulative oxidative stress with disrupted mitochondrial respiration and mitochondrial damage are related to Alzheimer's disease, Parkinson's disease, and other neurodegenerative diseases.

Oxidative stress is thought to be linked to certain cardiovascular disease, since oxidation of LDL in the vascular endothelium is a precursor to plaque formation.  Oxidative stress also plays a role in the ischemic cascade due to oxygen reperfusion injury following hypoxia.  This cascade includes both strokes and heart attacks. Oxidative stress has also been implicated in chronic fatigue syndrome (ME/CFS). Oxidative stress also contributes to tissue injury following irradiation and hyperoxia, as well as in diabetes. In hematological cancers, such as leukemia, the impact of oxidative stress can be bilateral. Reactive oxygen species can disrupt the function of immune cells, promoting immune evasion of leukemic cells. On the other hand, high levels of oxidative stress can also be selectively toxic to cancer cells.

Oxidative stress is likely to be involved in age-related development of cancer.  The reactive species produced in oxidative stress can cause direct damage to the DNA and are therefore mutagenic, and it may also suppress apoptosis and promote proliferation, invasiveness and metastasis.  Infection by Helicobacter pylori which increases the production of reactive oxygen and nitrogen species in human stomach is also thought to be important in the development of gastric cancer.

Antioxidants as supplements

The use of antioxidants to prevent some diseases is controversial. In a high-risk group like smokers, high doses of beta carotene increased the rate of lung cancer since high doses of beta-carotene in conjunction of high oxygen tension due to smoking results in a pro-oxidant effect and an antioxidant effect when oxygen tension is not high. In less high-risk groups, the use of vitamin E appears to reduce the risk of heart disease. However, while consumption of food rich in vitamin E may reduce the risk of coronary heart disease in middle-aged to older men and women, using vitamin E supplements also appear to result in an increase in total mortality, heart failure, and hemorrhagic stroke. The American Heart Association therefore recommends the consumption of food rich in antioxidant vitamins and other nutrients, but does not recommend the use of vitamin E supplements to prevent cardiovascular disease.  In other diseases, such as Alzheimer's, the evidence on vitamin E supplementation is also mixed.  Since dietary sources contain a wider range of carotenoids and vitamin E tocopherols and tocotrienols from whole foods, ex post facto epidemiological studies can have differing conclusions than artificial experiments using isolated compounds. AstraZeneca's radical scavenging nitrone drug NXY-059 shows some efficacy in the treatment of stroke.

Oxidative stress (as formulated in Denham Harman's free-radical theory of aging) is also thought to contribute to the aging process. While there is good evidence to support this idea in model organisms such as Drosophila melanogaster and Caenorhabditis elegans, recent evidence from Michael Ristow's laboratory suggests that oxidative stress may also promote life expectancy of Caenorhabditis elegans by inducing a secondary response to initially increased levels of reactive oxygen species. The situation in mammals is even less clear. Recent epidemiological findings support the process of mitohormesis, however a 2007 meta-analysis indicating studies with a low risk of bias (randomization, blinding, follow-up) find that some popular antioxidant supplements (Vitamin A, Beta Carotene, and Vitamin E) may increase mortality risk (although studies more prone to bias reported the reverse).

The USDA removed the table showing the Oxygen Radical Absorbance Capacity (ORAC) of Selected Foods Release 2 (2010) table due to the lack of evidence that the antioxidant level present in a food translated into a related antioxidant effect in the body.

Metal catalysts
Metals such as iron, copper, chromium, vanadium, and cobalt are capable of redox cycling in which a single electron may be accepted or donated by the metal. This action catalyzes production of reactive radicals and reactive oxygen species. The presence of such metals in biological systems in an uncomplexed form (not in a protein or other protective metal complex) can significantly increase the level of oxidative stress. These metals are thought to induce Fenton reactions and the Haber-Weiss reaction, in which hydroxyl radical is generated from hydrogen peroxide. The hydroxyl radical then can modify amino acids. For example, meta-tyrosine and ortho-tyrosine form by hydroxylation of phenylalanine. Other reactions include lipid peroxidation and oxidation of nucleobases. Metal-catalyzed oxidations also lead to irreversible modification of arginine, lysine, proline, and threonine. Excessive oxidative-damage leads to protein degradation or aggregation.

The reaction of transition metals with proteins oxidated by reactive oxygen or nitrogen species can yield reactive products that accumulate and contribute to aging and disease. For example, in Alzheimer's patients, peroxidized lipids and proteins accumulate in lysosomes of the brain cells.

Non-metal redox catalysts
Certain organic compounds in addition to metal redox catalysts can also produce reactive oxygen species. One of the most important classes of these is the quinones. Quinones can redox cycle with their conjugate semiquinones and hydroquinones, in some cases catalyzing the production of superoxide from dioxygen or hydrogen peroxide from superoxide.

Immune defense
The immune system uses the lethal effects of oxidants by making the production of oxidizing species a central part of its mechanism of killing pathogens; with activated phagocytes producing both reactive oxygen and nitrogen species. These include superoxide , nitric oxide (•NO) and their particularly reactive product, peroxynitrite (ONOO-). Although the use of these highly reactive compounds in the cytotoxic response of phagocytes causes damage to host tissues, the non-specificity of these oxidants is an advantage since they will damage almost every part of their target cell. This prevents a pathogen from escaping this part of immune response by mutation of a single molecular target.

Male infertility

Sperm DNA fragmentation appears to be an important factor in the aetiology of male infertility, since men with high DNA fragmentation levels have significantly lower odds of conceiving. Oxidative stress is the major cause of DNA fragmentation in spermatozoa.  A high level of the oxidative DNA damage 8-oxo-2'-deoxyguanosine is associated with abnormal spermatozoa and male infertility.

Aging

In a rat model of premature aging, oxidative stress induced DNA damage in the neocortex and hippocampus was substantially higher than in normally aging control rats.  Numerous studies have shown that the level of 8-oxo-2'-deoxyguanosine, a product of oxidative stress, increases with age in the brain and muscle DNA of the mouse, rat, gerbil and human. Further information on the association of oxidative DNA damage with aging is presented in the article DNA damage theory of aging. However, it was recently shown that the fluoroquinolone antibiotic Enoxacin can diminish aging signals and promote lifespan extension in nematodes C. elegans by inducing oxidative stress.

Origin of eukaryotes

The great oxygenation event began with the biologically induced appearance of oxygen in the Earth's atmosphere about 2.45 billion years ago. The rise of oxygen levels due to cyanobacterial photosynthesis in ancient microenvironments was probably highly toxic to the surrounding biota. Under these conditions, the selective pressure of oxidative stress is thought to have driven the evolutionary transformation of an archaeal lineage into the first eukaryotes. Oxidative stress might have acted in synergy with other environmental stresses (such as ultraviolet radiation and/or desiccation) to drive this selection. Selective pressure for efficient repair of oxidative DNA damages may have promoted the evolution of eukaryotic sex involving such features as cell-cell fusions, cytoskeleton-mediated chromosome movements and emergence of the nuclear membrane. Thus, the evolution of meiotic sex and eukaryogenesis may have been inseparable processes that evolved in large part to facilitate repair of oxidative DNA damages.

COVID-19 and cardiovascular injury 
It has been proposed that oxidative stress may play a major role to determine cardiac complications in COVID-19.

See also 

 Antioxidative stress
 Acatalasia
 Bruce Ames
 Malondialdehyde, an oxidative stress marker
 Mitochondrial free radical theory of aging
 Mitohormesis
 Nitric oxide
 Pro-oxidant
 Reductive stress

References 

Cell biology
Chemical pathology
Alzheimer's disease
Senescence